Said Daw (born 22 July 1960) is an Egyptian diver. He competed in two events at the 1984 Summer Olympics.

References

External links
 

1960 births
Living people
Egyptian male divers
Olympic divers of Egypt
Divers at the 1984 Summer Olympics
Place of birth missing (living people)
20th-century Egyptian people
21st-century Egyptian people